Westfield is a New Jersey Transit railroad station on the Raritan Valley Line, in Westfield, Union County, New Jersey, United States.

Station layout
The station has two high-level side platforms. The station consists of two buildings: the main building on the north (westbound platform) side of the track houses a non-profit group, the south (eastbound platform) side of the tracks houses the ticket office and waiting area and the platform has two ticket vending machines. The present north building was built in 1892, while the present south building was built in 1912 by the Central Railroad of New Jersey (CNJ). An access tunnel connects the two platforms and, like Cranford, there are historic photographs of Westfield displayed in the tunnel.

References

External links

world.nycsubway.org - NJT Raritan Line
 North Station House from Google Maps Street View

NJ Transit Rail Operations stations
Railway stations in Union County, New Jersey
Former Central Railroad of New Jersey stations
Railway stations in the United States opened in 1839
Westfield, New Jersey
1839 establishments in New Jersey